William Jennings Demorest (aka W. Jennings Demorest) (1822–1895), from New York City, was an American magazine publisher, national prohibition leader, and, in collaboration with his second wife, Ellen Demorest, née Curtis, attained international success from his wife's development of paper patterns for sewing fashion apparel of the day.  Together, they built a fashion manufacturing and merchandising empire from it.

He and his wife launched five magazines and started a cosmetics company. He individually patented a sewing machine and a velocipede.

Demorest harbored lifelong political and religious aspirations.  He is widely known for being a Prohibition activist and ran for Mayor of New York City on the Prohibition ticket.  He also organized the Anti-Nuisance League.

Town named for Demorest

Magazines
 1860: Mme Demorest's Mirror of Fashions was first published as a quarterly
 Summer 1863 —  Mirror of Fashions became a monthly
 January 1864 — Demorest purchased New York Illustrated News
 September 1864 —  Demorest combined New York Illustrated News with the Mirror of Fashions

 January 1879 —  Changed the name to Demorest Family Magazine
 October 1899 —  Final publication of Demorest Family Magazine
 Demorest Monthly Magazine, The
 Demorest's Illustrated News
 Demorest's Illustrated Monthly Magazine

 In 1873, Demorest joined the printing firm of Little, Rennie & Co. (founded in 1867 by Joseph James Little).  In 1876, the firm became known as J.J. Little & Company.

Location of operations

 Demorest Studio Building — 4 & 6 W 14th St

Political party affiliations

 Prohibition Party (New York City) —

Marriages

 In 1845, Demorest married Margaret Willamina Poole (1823–1857), daughter of Joseph and Jeannette Poole.  While living on Varick Street, they had two children: (i) Vienna Willamina Demorest (1847-?) and Henry Clay Demorest (1850–1928).
 On April 15, 1858, Demorest married Ellen Louise Curtis (1825–1898) — a fashion arbiter.

Other Interests
In 1881 he published the song, Sweet Wind of Eve, by Henry Tucker.

References

1822 births
1895 deaths
Fashion journalism
American temperance activists
New York (state) Prohibitionists
Businesspeople from New York City
Activists from New York (state)
19th-century American businesspeople